Habtezion Hadgu is an Eritrean General who is credited as the founder and first commander of the Eritrean Air Force.

Career 
He was an Ethiopian Air force pilot during the Mengistu regime, and later defected during the Eritrean War of Independence to the Eritrean People Liberation Front (EPLF) in the late 1980s. He was specifically a MiG-23 pilot. When the air force was established, Commander Hadgu called many officers who served in the Ethiopian Air Force to serve in Eritrea.

During the Eritrean–Ethiopian War, Hadgu was directly responsible for the air power response of the Eritrean Defence Forces to Ethiopian military.

Arrest 
Hadgu was arrested in late January 2003, shortly after an Ethiopian fighter plane landed in Asmara and Air Force officials attempted to contact Hadgu at his home. Within minutes of the landing of the plane, President Isaias Afwerki ordered the arrest of Hadgu. He was replaced, first by his deputy, Colonel Abraham Ogbaselasse, and then by Major General Teklai Habteslassie. On 23 July 2003, Hadgu, was arrested again, with the government giving no reasons for his arrest. Hadgu has been held incommunicado in prison for more than 15 years, and his fate is unknown, as he was never again mentioned in public.

Personal life 
He was married and has a son, Semhar Habtezion, who has in recent years advocated for more information on his fate.

References 

Eritrean soldiers
Eritrean politicians
Living people
Year of birth missing (living people)